Zoltán Berczik (7 August 1937 – 11 January 2011) was a Hungarian table tennis player. In the late fifties he was ranked among the best European table tennis players and won, with his athletic play, the first two titles at the Table Tennis European Championships.

Berczik was born in Novi Sad.  He began his career as a defensive player. With the advent of topspin in the late 1950s he turned his game around to attack.  He died in Budapest.

National success
He won the Hungarian championship in single continuously from 1959 to 1964. He won the double competition in 1959 with László Földy, in 1960 and 1961 with Ferenc Sido, in 1962 Miklós Péterfy, in 1963 with János Faházi and 1967 with István Jony. In mixed doubles he won in 1960 with Gizella Farkas and Éva Kóczián in 1967.

He won the team championships in 1957, 1958, 1959, 1962 and 1964 with the club Vasútépítő Törekvés and in 1965, 1966, 1967 and 1969 with Bp. Vasutas SC.

World Championships
Berczik took part in World Cups five times: in 1957 he secured the silver medal with the Hungarian team. This happened again at the World Cup in 1959, where he also won the bronze medal in doubles with László Földy and mixed with Gizi Farkas. At the World Cup in 1961, he was third with the team and runner-up in doubles with Ferenc Sido. In 1963 and 1965 he won no medals.

European Championships
At the Youth European Championship in 1955 in Stuttgart, he arrived in final in doubles, where he lost.

He achieved his greatest success at the European Championships in 1958 and 1960. Here he became European champion both in  single and with the Hungarian team. In 1958 he won the Mixed with Gizi Farkas-Lantos, in 1960 the double competition with Ferenc Sidó. In 1964 he reached the final of the individual, which he lost to Kjell Johansson, and semi-finals in doubles.

Trainer and author
From 1969 he served as coach for the Hungarian national team. After a stay in Japan in 1985, he coached Budapest  Vasutas SC. In the 1990s he wrote a series of articles for coaches on the table tennis tactics:
 1992: Tactics (2): establishment of tactics for a match
 1992: Tactics (3): The tactics of the offensive player
 1993: Tactics (5): Exercises for offensive players
 1993: Tactics (6): Exercises for offensive players
 1994: Tactics (7)
 1994: Tactics (8)

Berczik ended his coaching career in 1996.

See also
 List of table tennis players
 List of World Table Tennis Championships medalists

References

External links
ITTF stats

1937 births
2011 deaths
Hungarian male table tennis players